Nerses Ounanian (1 August 1924 in Samos – 18 December 1957 in Montevideo) was a Uruguayan artist of Armenian descent.

He was a pupil of Antonio Pena and Edmundo Prati. His most representative work is a memorial to the Armenian Genocide in the Bella Vista neighbourhood of Montevideo, where also a street bears his name.

References

External links
 Nerses Ounanian - Museo Nacional de Artes Visuales
 Nerses Ounanian on stamps

1924 births
1957 deaths
People from Samos
Greek people of Armenian descent
Uruguayan people of Armenian descent
Uruguayan sculptors
Male sculptors
20th-century sculptors
Uruguayan male artists